Tan Sri Sir Philip Ernest Housden Pike,  (6 March 1914 – 20 March 2011) was a Jamaican barrister and judge who served as the second Chief Justice of Borneo,  and later Chief Justice of Malawi and Chief Justice of Swaziland.

Early life and education 
Pike was born in the Colony of Jamaica on 6 March 1914. He attended the local De Carteret School and Munro College. At the age of 24, he was called to the English Bar by Middle Temple on 29 June 1938.

Career 
Pike's first appointment came on 22 May 1949 when he was appointed as a legal draftsman of the Kenya Colony. On 15 January 1950, he was officially appointed acting Solicitor-General in addition to his duties as legal draftsman. He would assume the same acting duties again beginning 11 April 1951. Pike served in this office until the 5 May 1952.

After leaving Kenya, Pike was next assigned to the Uganda Protectorate. On 1 February 1954, he was appointed as one of the members of the Uganda Legislative Council.

In 1958, Pike was assigned to the Crown Colony of Sarawak to serve as its Attorney-General. Later in September 1965, he was elevated as Chief Justice of Borneo, an office he held until his retirement in August 1968.

Pike was appointed acting Chief Justice of Malawi in 1969, and then Chief Justice of Swaziland from 1970 to 1972.

Personal life and death 
Pike died on 20 March 2011, at the age of 97.

Honours 
  :
  Honorary Commander of the Order of the Defender of the Realm (PMN (K)) - Tan Sri (1968)
  :
  Knight Bachelor (Kt) - Sir (1969)

References 

1914 births
2011 deaths
20th-century Jamaican lawyers
Chief justices of Eswatini
Chief justices of Malawi
Jamaican Queen's Counsel
20th-century King's Counsel
Jamaican knights
Jamaican Knights Bachelor
Members of the Middle Temple
Jamaican expatriates in Kenya
Jamaican expatriates in Uganda
Jamaican expatriates in Malaysia
Honorary Commanders of the Order of the Defender of the Realm